The T-84 is a Ukrainian main battle tank (MBT), based on the Soviet T-80 MBT introduced in 1976, specifically the diesel engine version: T-80UD. The T-84 was first built in 1994 and entered service in the Ukrainian Armed Forces in 1999. Its high-performance opposed-piston engine makes it a fast tank, comparable to other modern MBTs with a power-to-weight ratio of about 26 horsepower per tonne (19 kW/t).

The T-84 Oplot is an advanced version incorporating an armoured ammunition compartment in a new turret bustle. Ten of these entered Ukrainian service in 2001. The T-84-120 Yatagan is a prototype model intended for export, mounting a 120 mm gun able to fire standard NATO ammunition and guided missiles.

Development history 
After the adoption of the T-80 tank, the Soviets began improving its design. The disadvantages of the gas-turbine engine were readily apparent, and so several design projects were initiated to adopt a diesel alternative.

Development of the T-80UD 
Leningrad Kirov Plant (LKZ) began work in 1975 with a diesel 2V16 1500 hp engine on a T-80B chassis. This was designated the Ob. 219RD. Work was not completed until 1983. The design bureau at Omsk Transport Engineering Design Bureau developed a test bed, called the Ob. 644, powered by the V-46-6 of the T-72. Further work on these was not continued, as the main focus at the time was on the gas-turbine engine favored by Defence Minister Dmitry Ustinov.

In 1975, Kharkiv Morozov Machine Building Design Bureau (KMDB) began work on the Object (Ob.) 278, a T-80 powered by a 6TD 1000 hp diesel engine developed for the improved T-64 and T-74. This quickly became outclassed by the Ob. 476, and so lost favor. The Ob. 478M was a more sophisticated model than the Ob. 478. Improvements included the Sistema fire control system, Shatter active protection system, and a 1,500 hp diesel engine. This too was abandoned as it was considered too costly.

After the death of Ustinov in 1984, the strength of the design bureau of the LKZ began to weaken and the Ministry of Defense started to think seriously about equipping the T-80 tanks with diesel engines.

In September 1985, the government approved the development start of a diesel-powered T-80U. Five prototypes of the Ob. 478B with the 6TD engine were produced by year's end. Prototypes of a less sophisticated model, called Ob. 478A, were built for comparison. The government approved production of the Ob. 478B in 1986. The Soviet Army noted problems with the tank, and full-scale production was delayed to make changes. The Soviet Army also opposed a plan to name the tank the T-84, as KMDB had originally envisioned, because it would draw attention to the fact that the Soviets were operating four tanks (T-64, T-72, T-80 and T-84) with more or less similar characteristics. The Central Committee settled the debate, siding with the Army. It was subsequently adopted into service as the T-80UD.

The T-80UD was first deployed to the 4th Guards Tank Division and the 2nd Guards Motor Rifle Division. It was first publicly shown at the 1990 Moscow Victory Day Parade, then later in the 1991 Soviet coup d'état attempt.

Development of the T-84 
KMDB developed a welded turret to replace cast turrets, which were no longer made in Ukraine after the breakup of the Soviet Union. A T-80UD with this turret, Ob. 478BK, was completed in 1995. Ukraine delivered 175 Ob. 478BE to Pakistan by 1999. The Ob. 478D with Aynet fire control system and Buran night sight was trialed. Pilots of the Ob. 478DU and Ob. 478DU2 were also produced. One prototype appeared at International Defence Exhibition (IDEX) in 1995 as the "T-84 Supertank." An Ob. 478DM appeared at IDEX 1999 as the T-84M. The Ob. 478DU4 gave rise to the T-84 Oplot, which was marketed to Turkey. The 125 mm caliber gun was replaced with a 120 mm one able to fire NATO ammunition, and designated the T-84-120. This was marketed to Turkey as the Yatagan, and was trialed there in 2000.

The Ukrainian government eventually made good on its promise to buy the T-84 for the Ukrainian Army. Ten T-84Ms were delivered from 2001 to 2003. Ukraine was forced to sell off four of these to the United States when it struggled to finance the tanks.

Development of the T-84-120 
The T-84-120 Yatagan was developed in 2000 in Kharkiv to NATO standards for the Turkish tender for a new MBT. The tank featured a 120mm smooth bore gun that was capable of firing AT-11 Sniper ATGMs, a reloading mechanism and blow-out panels. The Yatagan was also equipped with communications equipment from the French Thomson company, an FN Herstal machine gun, automatic transmission, a 6TD-2 diesel engine with 1200hp and FCS taken from Oplot. In total, three 120mm guns of different designs were tested on the tank. The T-84-120 Yatagan also participated in the Kyiv parade. The current condition of the tank is unknown.

Design

The T-84's outstanding feature is a 26 hp/t power-to-weight ratio. It is also designed to perform well in hot climates, and includes an air-conditioned crew compartment (operating temperature range is claimed to be −40 to 55 °C).

The BM Oplot is a further development of the prior T-84 Oplot. The tank has a conventional layout with the driver's compartment at the front, fighting compartment in the middle and engine at the rear, accommodating a crew of three.

The driver sitting in the centre is provided with a single-piece hatch cover that opens to the right. The commander on the right and the gunner on the left have single-piece hatches.

The tank has a length of 9.7 m (including the forward-facing gun), a width of 3.4 m without removable side skirts, and a height of 2.8 m. The combat weight of the tank is 51 tons.

Armament
The Oplot is armed with a smoothbore 125 mm KBA-3 cannon, a KT-7.62 (PKT) coaxial machine gun and a KT-12.7 anti-aircraft machine gun. The main gun is fed by a loading system equipped with conveyor, automatic loader, and control system. The ammunition includes high explosive fragmentation (HE-FRAG), armour-piercing fin-stabilized discarding sabot (APFSDS) kinetic energy penetrator, and high-explosive anti-tank (HEAT).

The main gun can also fire a laser guided missile against armoured ground vehicles and hovering helicopters within the range of 5,000m. The missile can be fired on the move against travelling targets. A tandem-charge warhead fitted on the missile can defeat targets equipped with explosive reactive armour (ERA) and advanced spaced armour.

The Oplot has 46 rounds of ammunition for the main gun, of which 28 rounds are placed in the automatic loader. Other ammunition types carried are 1,250 rounds for KT-7.62 machine gun, 450 rounds for KT-12.7 machine gun and 450 rounds for AKS Assault rifle.

Fire control
The vehicle has three forward-facing periscopes in front of the driver's cupola. The centre periscope can be replaced with a night driving device.

The fire control system includes a gunner's day sight, PNK-6 commander's panoramic sighting system, PTT-2 thermal imaging sight, anti-aircraft sight and anti-aircraft machine gun control system. Detection range of targets for thermal sighting system is up to 8 km.

The tank is also equipped with LIO-V ballistic computer, armament stabiliser and other systems.

The advanced fire-control system enables the gunner or commander to lay and fire the main armament on the move. The stationary and moving targets can be hit with a high first round hit probability.

Protection
The protection system includes multilayer passive armour, Duplet explosive reactive armour, Zaslin Active Protection System, Varta optronic countermeasures system and other tank protection means.

Built-in new generation Duplet anti-tandem-charge warhead explosive reactive armour protects against APFSDS, high-explosive squash head (HESH or HEP) and high-explosive anti-tank (HEAT) rounds.

Duplet improves protection against:
 Hand anti-tank grenades, hand-held, and stationary grenade launchers and recoilless guns (including ammunition with tandem-charge warheads)
 Anti-tank guided missiles of TOW-2, MILAN, and Shturm-S type
 HEAT projectiles fired by 125 mm tank smoothbore guns
 APFSDS projectiles fired by 125 mm and 120 mm tank guns

Both sides of the driver's compartment are fitted with explosive reactive armour (ERA) panels for extended protection. The hull sides are hinged with large rubber skirts to withstand the attacks of man-portable anti-tank weapons. The modular ERA package can be easily replaced or upgraded as needed by future requirements.

Oplot features a Varta optronic countermeasures system for deceiving incoming missiles and anti-tank guided weapons. The system integrates laser warning sensors, infra-red jammer, and smoke or aerosol screen laying system. The optronic countermeasure system can:
 confuse the guidance systems of anti-tank guided missiles (ATGM) by emitting laser jamming covering the horizontal plane of ±18° relative to the main gun tube and ±2° in the vertical plane
 jam ATGM guidance systems that use laser guidance illumination of targets, semi-automatic laser guided homing projectiles, and artillery systems equipped with laser range-finders by activating the remote fast-deploying aerosol screens in a sector of ±45° relative to the main gun tube

Crew's collective protection system protects the crew and interior equipment against effects of nuclear explosions, radioactive substances, toxic agents, biological warfare agents, and detects and suppresses fires in the compartments of crew and power pack.

The Oplot tank can withstand an explosion of up to 10 kg trinitrotoluene (TNT) under the tank track and up to 4 kg TNT under the driver's compartment.
The vehicle has overpressure-type NBC protection system and can be fitted with track mine-clearing systems.

Due to the collapse of Soviet Union, the Malyshev Factory was no longer able to obtain ceramic armour modules from Russia and only the initial batch of T-84 were produced with such. Instead, later batches of T-84's composite armour is composed of special purpose rubber sandwiched between steel and alloy plates. The exact difference in performance between the new and prior armor is unknown and depends on the performance of dynamic armor.

Engine and mobility
BM Oplot is powered by a 6TD-2E 6-cylinder turbocharged liquid-cooled engine, which delivers . It is improved and more environmentally friendly version of the prior 6TD-2 diesel engine, used on the T-84 MBT. The tank could also be powered by a more powerful 6TD-3 diesel, developing . Both engines could use diesel, jet engine fuel, petrol or any mixtures of them.

The tank is also equipped with a diesel-electric auxiliary power unit  to supply power to onboard systems when the main engine is off.

BM Oplot is equipped with torsion bar suspension. Either side of the six dual rubber-tyred road wheels are provided with idler at forward, drive sprocket at the rear, and track support rollers.

The first, second and sixth road wheel stations are fitted with hydraulic shock absorbers. The tank can negotiate a gradient of 32° and side slope of 25°. Equally, the tank can ford a water depth of 5m using deep water fording equipment.

Variants

Object 478
 Basic version

Object 478M
 Improvements included the Sistema fire control system, Shatter active protection system, and a 1500 hp diesel engine.

Object 478A Comparison model; a simplified Object 478B

Object 478B
 The T-80UD

T-84
 Ukrainian MBT based on the T-80UD. New welded turret and Shtora-1 countermeasures suite, new electronics, new main gun, new armor, and 1,200 hp (895 kW) 6TD-2 diesel engine.

T-84U
 Ukrainian upgrade of the T-84. New armoured side skirts, turret-conformal Kontakt-5 explosive reactive armour, auxiliary power unit, thermal imaging sight, satellite navigation, commander's laser range-finder, muzzle reference system, and other improvements.

T-84 Oplot 
 T-84U with a new welded turret and an additional ammunition compartment mounted to the turret bustle. This "Ammunition Bunker" is separated from the crew to protect them in the event of an ammunition cookoff.

T-84-120 Yatagan
 A prototype version of Oplot tailored for evaluation by the Turkish Army (prototype designation, KERN2-120). Mounts a 120 mm main gun which fires both NATO 120 mm rounds (like the M829 DU series) and a special 120 mm version of the AT-11 Sniper ATGM. Most significantly, the Yatagan features a completely redesigned "Cassette style" bustle mounted autoloader (similar to 'Leclerc' or 'K2 Black Panther'), replacing the soviet-era carousel autoloader. This redesign allows all ammunition in the ready-rack to be separated from the crew and equipped with blowout panels, features considered standard for NATO MBTs. It also has automated gear shifting in place of a mechanical gear selector, driver's T-bar control replacing tiller bars, air conditioning, and projectile muzzle velocity sensor, and differences in the fire control system, communications, etc.

T-84 Oplot-M
 Modernized, or "BM Oplot": The newest and most sophisticated version of the T-84 is an upgraded version of the "T-84 Oplot" mounting more advanced armor, new electronic countermeasure systems, and others. One visible feature is the new PNK-6 panoramic tank sight.

T-84 Oplot-T
"BM Oplot-T" is an export version for Thailand. It has some minor modifications to meet local requirements, such as different radio, air conditioner and so on. Thailand ordered 49 of these tanks. Originally it was planned that all of them will be delivered by 2014. However, due to ongoing military conflict in Ukraine, the delivery was postponed to and completed in 2018.
BREM-84 Atlet
 Armoured recovery vehicle based on the T-84 Oplot chassis
BREM-T
 Armoured recovery vehicle based on the T-84 Oplot-T chassis.
BMU-84
 Bridgelayer tank.
BTMP-84
 Heavy infantry fighting vehicle prototype based on the T-84 Oplot tank, with lengthened hull, an extra pair of road wheels, and a rear compartment for five infantrymen.

Service history

Ukraine
The first T-84 prototype vehicle rolled out in 1994, and in the same year it was decided to build several more vehicles. They were subjected to extensive company and army trials. After successful completion of the extensive trials programme in the late 1990s the T-84 entered service with the Ukrainian Army in 1999.

During the 2022 Russian invasion of Ukraine, at least one T-84U was deployed with the 3rd Tank Brigade in Donbas, near Barvinkove and Slovyansk.  T-84 tanks were believed to be deployed with the 14th Separate Mechanized Brigade (Ukraine) in Donbas.

Thailand
In March 2011, the Royal Thai Army placed an order for 49 T-84s to replace its fleet of aging M41A3 Walker Bulldog light tanks. In September 2011, the Malyshev Plant announced plans to produce the first batch of five Oplot-T tanks for the Thai Army by the end of the year. Under the contract, the Ukrainian company will make 49 tanks worth over US$200 million.

The government approved 7.155 billion baht to purchase the first 49 Oplot tanks to be assigned to several units: the 2nd Cavalry battalion (Royal Guard at Fort Chakrabongse, Prachinburi), the 4th Cavalry battalion (Royal Guard at Kiakkai, Bangkok), the 8th Cavalry battalion (Fort Suranari, Nakhon Ratchasima), and the 9th Cavalry battalion (Fort Ekathotsarot, Phitsanuloke).

In April 2017, it was reported that following the delayed deliveries from this tank, the Royal Thai Army was expected to decline the remainder of the sale and acquired the Chinese VT-4 main battle tank instead of the Ukrainian tank, due to the long term delivery schedule. The signed order for 49 units had to be completed by the month of January, 2017, it was reported that other deliveries may not be expected.

A 26 March 2018 press release by Ukroboronprom stated that the 2011 contract for supplying Oplot-T tanks to Thailand had successfully completed and that the last party of tanks had passed checks by the customers and would be sent to the buyer in the near future.

Operators

Current operators
 
 The Ukrainian Ground Forces has 9 T-84 in service.

 
 According to The Military Balance 2019, Thailand had acquired 49 T-84 Oplot main battle tanks.

Evaluation-only operators 
 
 1 unit, for technologies analysis and operational OPFOR training.

Potential sales
 
 In 2017, Ukraine was in talks with Pakistan for the potential sale of 100 Oplot Tanks. Though Pakistan evaluated the Oplot in 2015-2017, it selected the VT-4 MBT instead. However later on, Heavy Industries Taxila and Ukrspecexport signed a MoU worth $600 million to upgrade the existing fleet of Pakistan's T-80UD MBTs possibly to T-84 Oplot-M standard.

Failed bids
 
, Azerbaijan showed interest in the Oplot main battle tank. The Defense Ministry of Ukraine has long been holding negotiations on this issue. In June 2013, it has been made public that Azerbaijan had instead purchased 100 Russian T-90 tanks, in a series of rearmament deals worth $4 billion with Russia.

 
In 1998, the T-84M Oplot entered the tender for a new base tank for Greece. The Leopard 2A6 won the tender, defeating the French Leclerc, the British Challenger, the American Abrams, the Ukrainian T-84M and the Russian  T-80U.

 
The T-84 Yatagan was offered to the Malaysian Army in 2002. But the contract was lost to the Polish PT-91.

 
In 2009, Peru reportedly tested the Oplot tank, but the government of Alan Garcia later decided to acquire test examples of the Chinese MBT-2000 in late 2010, only to have the government of his successor, Ollanta Humala, abandon the purchase in early 2012 to seek other alternatives. , the T-84 was reported to be part of comparative tests to be conducted by Peru. The T-84 competed against the T-90S, the M1A1 Abrams, the Leopard 2A4 and A6, and the T-64 also offered by Ukraine. By September 2013, only the T-84, T-90S, Russian T-80, and M1A1 Abrams were still competing.

 
The Turkish Army considered the T-84, but withdrew from it in favor of developing the Altay with Hyundai Rotem.

Gallery 
Object 478 at National Museum of the History of Ukraine in the Second World War, Kyiv:

See also

 PT-91#History, PT-91M
 M-84AS
 Karrar
 T-90
 Type 99 tank

References

Sources

External links

 T-84 Oplot Data Sheet and pictures
 Kharkiv Morozov Machine Building Design Bureau—Ukrainian producer of the T-80. KMDB's pages for T-80UD, T-84 Oplot, T-84 Yatagan, and T-84 Oplot-M.
 T-84 MBT at globalsecurity.org
 T-84 MBT at military-today.com
 Hromadske.ua, “Ukraine’s Tanks Are So Good, Its Own Army Can’t Afford Them,” 2017-09-14.

Post–Cold War main battle tanks
Main battle tanks of Ukraine
Tanks with autoloaders
Military vehicles introduced in the 1990s